Jong Song-ok (born 18 August 1974) is a female long-distance runner and politician from North Korea, who won the world title in the women's marathon at the 1999 World Championships in Athletics in Seville, Spain. To date, it is the only medal ever won by a North Korean athlete at the World Championships.

Career
Jong debuted internationally at the 1995 Military World Games where she finished second. She emerged as a new star in a series of North Korean marathoners after having placed third at the Beijing Marathon.

She competed at 1996 Summer Olympics in Atlanta, finishing 20th in the women's marathon.

Jong is the first North Korean sportsperson to have received the title of Heroine of the Republic. She also holds the title of People's Athlete.

Later life
In 2000, Jong did not participate in either the Boston Marathon or the Summer Olympics in Sydney; South Korean media claimed this was due to the personal instruction of North Korean leader Kim Jong-il. Jong became a delegate to the 10th Supreme People's Assembly in March 2000.

Jong married fellow marathon runner Kim Jung-won in March 2001. During the 2008 Olympic torch relay in Pyongyang, she was the last person to carry the Olympic torch through the streets.

Achievements

References

Works cited

External links

 The World Marathon “QUEEN”, Jong Song-Ok
 

1974 births
Living people
People from Haeju
North Korean female marathon runners
Athletes (track and field) at the 1996 Summer Olympics
Olympic athletes of North Korea
World Athletics Championships medalists
North Korean female long-distance runners
World Athletics Championships athletes for North Korea
People's Athletes
21st-century North Korean women politicians
21st-century North Korean politicians
World Athletics Championships winners